Pakaraimaea is a genus of trees in the family Cistaceae.

The genus contains a single species, Pakaraimaea dipterocarpacea, from South America. The species is found in the western highlands of Guyana and in adjacent Bolivar State in Venezuela. It maintains strong ectomycorrhizal associations with a wide variety of fungal species. The trees can sometimes be seen forming large stands in the western Guyanas.

As of APG IV, the species has been moved out of the Dipterocarpaceae (formerly in subfamily Pakaraimoideae) and is now placed within an expanded Cistaceae due to molecular evidence showing that it is sister to the remainder of Cistaceae.

References

Dipterocarpaceae
Monotypic Malvales genera
Cistaceae